FC Chernomorets Novorossiysk is the oldest Russian association football club based in Novorossiysk.

UEFA Cup 2001–02
Managers: Sergey Andreyev (first leg), Khazret Dyshekov (second leg).

First round
 September 19, 2001 / FC Chernomorets Novorossiysk  - Valencia CF  0–1 (Mista ) / Central Stadium, Novorossiysk / Attendance: 10,000
FC Chernomorets: Gerus, Kyryukhin (Surodin, 90+3), Bezhenar, Mayorov, Oleinik, Svystunov, Alyakrinsky, Yershov (Oreshchuk, 61), Pavlus (Osipov, 82), Shevchenko, Zuyev.
Valencia CF: Cañizares, Pellegrino, Đukić, Marchena  (Navarro, 90+1), Carboni, Sánchez Moreno, Kily González (Vicente Rodríguez, 68), Rufete, de los Santos, Curro Torres, Mista (Carew, 76).

 September 27, 2001 / Valencia CF - FC Chernomorets Novorossiysk 5–0 (Sánchez Moreno   Ilie  Salva  Rufete ) / Estadio Mestalla, Valencia / Attendance: 27,000
Valencia CF: Cañizares, Ayala, Đukić, Ilie, Marchena, Carboni (Angulo, 46), Sánchez Moreno, Kily González, Rufete, Curro Torres (Albelda, 72), Mista (Salva, 31).
FC Chernomorets: Gerus, Bezhenar, Mayorov (Belkov, 60), Oleinik (Oreshchuk, 46), Svystunov, Alyakrinsky, Yershov, Pavlus, Shevchenko (Tlisov, 81), Osipov, Tchami.

References

External links
 
 

FC Chernomorets Novorossiysk
Chernomorets Novorossiysk